The 2019 Army Black Knights football team represented the United States Military Academy as an independent in the 2019 NCAA Division I FBS football season. The Black Knights were led by sixth-year head coach Jeff Monken and played their home games at Michie Stadium. Due to playing an away game at Hawaii and the NCAA's "Hawaii Exemption", the Black Knights played a 13-game regular season in 2019. They finished the season with a record of 5–8, finishing in third place for the Commander-in-Chief's Trophy following losses to Air Force and Navy, and missing out on a bowl game for the first time since the 2015 season.

Previous season
The Black Knights finished the 2018 season with a record of 11–2 and finished ranked No. 19 in the AP Poll and No. 20 in the Coaches' Poll. They won the Commander-in-Chief's Trophy for a second year in a row (first time ever), defeated archrival Navy for the third year in a row (first time since 1992-1996 seasons), played in and won their third straight bowl game (first time ever), finished with consecutive 10-win seasons (first time ever), finished with a second straight unbeaten record (6–0) at home to extend their home winning streak to 13 in a row, won the Lambert Trophy (first time since 1958), and finished with their first 11-win season ever.

Quarterback Kelvin Hopkins Jr. tied the academy records for total number of rushing touchdowns (17) and total number of touchdowns responsible for (23), as well as becoming the first Army player to rush and pass for over 1,000 yards each in a single season (1,017 and 1,026 respectively). Coach Monken was awarded the George Munger Collegiate Coach of the Year Award by the Maxwell Football Club, the Vince Lombardi College Football Coach of the Year Award by the Lombardi Foundation, and the President's Award by the Touchdown Club of Columbus.

Preseason

Offseason
Defensive coordinator Jay Bateman announced in December 2018 that he would be leaving to become the co-defensive coordinator and safeties coach at North Carolina under newly hired coach Mack Brown. Weeks later, head football strength and conditioning coach Brian Hess was announced as joining Bateman at North Carolina. Assistant football strength and conditioning coach Maurice Sims would also leave for North Carolina within the month. Safeties coach John Loose, after serving as the interim defensive coordinator for the 2018 Lockheed Martin Armed Forces Bowl victory over Houston, was announced as the full-time replacement at defensive coordinator on January 10, 2019.

On January 14, 2019, Army West Point announced a new multi-year contract extension for head coach Jeff Monken through the 2024 season. On the same day Army beat writer for the Times Herald-Record, Sal Interdonato, broke the news that Kansas Wesleyan head coach Matt Drinkall had joined the Army football staff as an offensive analyst. On January 18, Interdonato revealed that defensive line coach Chad Wilt had taken the same position with the Cincinnati Bearcats.

On January 31, the West Point athletics department announced that Matt Hachmann would be joining the football staff as the outside linebackers coach. He had spent the past two years as the linebackers coach at Stony Brook, and before that eight years as defensive coordinator at Towson. Because of his posting as linebackers coach, several defensive assistant coaches changed positions of responsibility.  Coach Daryl Dixon, the former outside linebackers coach, is now responsible for cornerbacks, and Coach Christian-Young, the former cornerbacks coach, is now responsible for safeties. Additionally, assistant strength and conditioning coach Conor Hughes was promoted to head football strength and conditioning coach. On February 5, Coach Monken's last assistant coach position was filled with the announcement of the hire of Kevin Lewis as defensive line coach. Lewis had spent the previous five seasons as the defensive line coach at William & Mary

On February 19 it was announced that Rusty Whitt and GC Yerry had been hired to serve as the two assistant football strength and conditioning coaches, filling out the remaining open positions on Monken's staff. Whitt joined the staff after serving as the head football strength and conditioning coach at Texas Tech from 2016−2018, while Yerry joined after serving as the director of athletic performance at Stony Brook, also from 2016−2018.

On March 19, the West Point athletics department announced that Jim Collins would join the staff as the new Director of Player Personnel. Collins brings 25 years of head coaching experience at the Division II and Division III levels, including tenures as the head coach at the University of Dubuque from 1994−1996, Capital University (OH) from 1997−2007, and most recently at Saginaw Valley State from 2008−2018.

The Black Knights began their spring football session on March 7 and concluded it on April 12th with the annual Black and Gold Spring Game, where the Black team completed a fourth quarter comeback to win 35−28 in overtime. Following the conclusion of spring ball, rising firsties  Kelvin Hopkins Jr. and Elijah Riley were named team captains in addition to returning 2018 captain Cole Christiansen.

The Black Knights' fall camp began on August 1 and consisted of 14 practices, finishing on August 17 with an intrasquad scrimmage in Michie Stadium. Following the completion of camp, the Black Knights shifted their preparation to their Week 1 matchup with Rice. During August, the Black Knights received votes for the preseason AP and Coaches Polls, just missing out on starting within the Top 25 for the first time since 1959. They received a total of 94 points in the AP Poll and 91 points in the Coaches Poll, placing 2nd and 5th respectively in each poll's 'Also Receiving Votes' category.

Award watch lists

Listed in the order that they were released.

Personnel

Coaching staff

 Tucker Waugh also served as the wide receivers coach at Army from 2000 to 2004.
 John Loose also served as the linebackers coach at Army from 1992 to 1999.
 Scott Swanson also served as an Assistant Strength & Conditioning coach at Army from 1995 to 1996.

Source:

Roster

The Army football roster for the Week 1 game versus Rice (as of August 26, 2019):

Depth chart

The Army football depth chart for the 120th Army-Navy Game (as of December 9, 2019):

Depth Chart 2019
True Freshman
Double Position : *

Schedule

Rankings

Game summaries

Rice

at Michigan

at UTSA

Morgan State

Tulane

at Western Kentucky

at Georgia State

San Jose State

at Air Force

UMass

VMI

at Hawaii

vs. Navy

Footnotes

References

Army
Army Black Knights football seasons
Army Black Knights football